Jamila Mejri (born Jamila Mejri Soudani; 1951 in Kairouan) is a Tunisian poet.

She won the Aboul-Qacem Echebbi prize, in 2005 for her 38 poems, Dhakiratou Attaïer.

She is the first woman to be elected President of the Union of Tunisian Writers at the Congress of December 2008.

Works

References 

1951 births
People from Kairouan
Living people